Chimène van Oosterhout (born February 11, 1964, in Willemstad, Curaçao) is a Dutch TV personality, actress and singer. Since 1996, she has been presenting programs on Dutch television (TROS, Veronica TV, SBS6, Net5 and RTL 4). She was the winner of several Dutch celebrity TV competitions (including Peking Express VIPS in 2006 and Top Chef in 2009). Van Oosterhout is also an actress. She appeared in the longest-running Dutch soap opera Goede Tijden, Slechte Tijden and had one of the leading parts in the American movie "X-Patriots" (2001) directed by Darien Sills-Evans. She owns her PR company (Van Oosterhout PR).

In January 2019, she became a member of Dutch girl group Luv' (as a replacement for Ria Thielsch). With Marga Scheide and José Hoebee, Chimène recorded the Latin pop-reggaeton single With Him Tonight which was released in July 2019. In early 2020, Luv' announced the interruption of their activities due to José Hoebee's ill health.

Early life

Chimène van Oosterhout was born on February 11, 1964, to a Dutch father and an Antillean mother (of Indian and Surinamese Creole descent). At age 7, she moved with her family to the Netherlands. As a teenager, she modelled occasionally. After her A-level, she studied communication and psychology. From 1987 to 1989, she was a PR manager at Club Med. Over the years, she has learned foreign languages (English, German, French, Spanish, Italian and Swedish).

TV career
In 1996, Chimène van Oosterhout sent a videotape to TROS and rapidly became a host on this channel. In 1999, she moved to Veronica TV and its sister channel Yorin. She later presented programs on SBS6, Net5 and RTL 4. In 2004, she was filmed with Marga Scheide and Patty Brard as they had a health cure on Ibiza on Patty's Fort (a reality show on Yorin).

TV shows
 Veronica goes back to the US of A (Veronica, 1999)
 Car Wars (Veronica, 1999)
 Demolition Cars (Veronica, 2000) 
 Motor TV (Veronica, 2000 – 2002)
 Go Travel (Veronica, 2001)
 Yorin Travel (Yorin, 2001–2003)
 Gordons Lifestyle (Yorin, 2001)
 City Report (Veronica, 2002)
 Sterrenbeurs (SBS 6, 2003)
 Televisiedokter (RTL 4/Yorin, 2005)
 Snowmagazine VIPS (SBS 6, 2006)
 Health Angels (RTL 4, 2006)
 4ME (RTL 4, 2010–2014)
 Medicaltravel (RTL 4, 2013)
 House Vision (RTL 4, 2013–2014)
 Sunny Side Up (RTL 4, 2016)
 Life Is Beautiful (RTL 4, 2016–2018)

Participation in celebrity TV competitions
 Patty's Fort (Yorin, 2004)
 Peking Express VIPS (NET 5, 2006 winner with Bart Veldkamp)
 Wildebeesten (NET 5, 2006, winner)
 Top Chef VIPS (RTL 4, 2009, winner)
 Vliegende Hollanders: Sterren van de Schans (SBS 6, 2013, winner)

Acting and documentary

Chimène van Oosterhout appeared in Dutch TV series (Goede Tijden, Slechte Tijden, Onderweg naar morgen, Mijn dochter en ik, Het zonnetje in huis and Duo B&B).

In 2000, she had one of the leading parts in the American movie "X- Patriots". Darien Sills-Evans wrote, directed and starred in this romantic comedy about two black American men who travelled to the Netherlands – a place where no one looked like them – in search of self-identity. X-Patriots premiered on June 23, 2001, in Chicago at the AngelCiti Film Festival where it won "Best Film" and be noted in the Chicago Reader as the "Critic's Choice". A successful film festival run followed, with the film picking up usually good reviews and awards that included the LA Weekly Award Best Screenplay 2002, CCI Digital Award for Best Ensemble Cast 2002, Film Finders Maverick Award for Quality Low-Budget Film 2002 (Method Fest), Best Feature Angelciti Chicago 2001, and nominated for the Gordon Parks Award IFP 2001. The last public showing of X-Patriots was in New York City at DCTV's 24-Hour Film Festival, where it won the Audience Award.

On March 1, 2021, Chimène van Oosterhout revealed on social media the trailer of a documentary series entitled "K*T Kanker" after she was diagnosed with breast cancer. In this documentary conceived by Filmfactory.nl (Evert den Hartogh and Jacco den Hartogh), she showed her life as a cancer patient.

Luv'

On January 4, 2019, Dutch girl group Luv' announced an unexpected line-up change in De Telegraaf: Chimène van Oosterhout replaced Ria Thielsch. The female pop trio toured the nostalgia circuit in the Netherlands and Belgium. In July 2019, Luv' released a Latin pop-reggaeton single entitled With Him Tonight with Latin Grammy-nominated producers Keith Morrison and Manuel Garrido-Lecca. On February 7, 2020, Luv' (which had not performed since September 2019 due to José Hoebee's illness) informed the media and the public about the interruption of their activities.

Van Oosterhout PR

Since the 2000s, with her own company, Van Oosterhout has been involved in PR activities and corporate events for several companies (including Man Trucks en Bussen, 2009 Dakar Rally, Coty Inc Prestige, Oral B, Feenstra and Visma).

Yoga instructor

Between 2014 and 2017, she received a Hatha yoga training to become a yoga instructor.

Personal life

On February 5, 2003, Chimène van Oosterhout gave birth to a son named Lyam.

References

External links
 
 Official Luv' Facebook Page

1964 births
Living people
Dutch women singers
Dutch television presenters
Dutch actresses
English-language singers from the Netherlands
People from Willemstad
Dutch women television presenters